Ferenc Mészáros (born 6 July 1963) is a Hungarian former footballer who played at both professional and international levels as a striker.

Career
Born in Szekszárd, Mészáros played club football in Hungary and Belgium for Pécsi and Lokeren.

He earned a total of 24 caps for Hungary.

References

1963 births
Living people
Hungarian footballers
Hungary international footballers
Association football forwards
Pécsi MFC players
K.S.C. Lokeren Oost-Vlaanderen players
Hungarian expatriate footballers
Expatriate footballers in Belgium
Hungarian expatriate sportspeople in Belgium
Pécsi MFC managers
Hungarian football managers
Nemzeti Bajnokság I managers
People from Szekszárd
Sportspeople from Tolna County